Hang Seng China-Affiliated Corporations Index or HSCCI is a stock index of the Stock Exchange of Hong Kong for red chip companies listed on the exchange, which are incorporated outside of mainland China, such as in Bermuda, the Cayman Islands, or Hong Kong, but are majority-owned by the central or regional government of the People's Republic of China.

As of January 2021, there are 25 red chips that compose this index.

In the past, the constituents of Hang Seng China-Affiliated Corporations Index did not intersect with H shares' Hang Seng China Enterprises Index, as H share and red chip companies did not intersect. But a possible inclusion of the top red chip companies to Hang Seng China Enterprises Index, was announced in August 2017.

Some of the constituents of Hang Seng China-Affiliated Corporations Index was also the constituents of Hang Seng Index (the blue-chip index). They were sometimes known as purple-chip, since red plus blue is purple.

Constituents

See also
 Hang Seng Index - blue chip index of the Stock Exchange of Hong Kong
 Hang Seng China Enterprises Index - index for H share of the Stock Exchange of Hong Kong

References

External links
 

Hang Seng Bank stock market indices
Hong Kong stock market indices
Lists of companies of China
Red chip companies